Chorus is a 1974 Bengali film directed by noted Indian art film director Mrinal Sen under the banner of Mrinal Sen Productions. It was entered into the 9th Moscow International Film Festival where it won a Silver Prize.

Cast
 Utpal Dutt
 Asit Bandopadhyay
 Sekhar Chatterjee
 Rabi Ghosh
 Dilip Roy
 Haradhan Banerjee
 Ajoy Bannerjee
 Subhendu Chatterjee
 Gita Sen
 Rasaraj Chakraborty
 Supantha Bhattacharjee

Awards
National Film Award for Best Feature Film
National Film Award for Best Cinematography (Black-and-white) – K. K. Mahajan
National Film Award for Best Music Direction – Ananda Shankar
Bengal Film Journalist Award for Best Supporting Actor- Asit Banerjee

References

External links

On the Mrinal Sen website

1974 films
1974 drama films
Bengali-language Indian films
Films directed by Mrinal Sen
Best Feature Film National Film Award winners
Films whose cinematographer won the Best Cinematography National Film Award
Indian black-and-white films
1970s Bengali-language films